Germaine Maurice Lindsay (23 September 1985 – 7 July 2005), also known as Abdullah Shaheed Jamal, was one of the four Islamist  suicide bombers who detonated bombs on three trains on the London Underground and a bus in central London during the 7 July 2005 London bombings, killing 56 people (including themselves), and injuring more than 700. Lindsay detonated the bomb that killed himself and 26 other people on a train travelling on the Piccadilly line between King's Cross St Pancras and Russell Square tube stations.

Biography

Lindsay was born in Jamaica; after moving to Britain at age five, he lived in Dalton, West Yorkshire, where he attended Rawthorpe Junior School and Rawthorpe High School. He subsequently moved to Aylesbury in Buckinghamshire.

Lindsay had converted to Islam shortly after his mother, Maryam McCleod Ismaiyl, converted to the faith in 2001 and encouraged him to do the same. He worked part-time as a carpet fitter and supplemented his income by selling covers for mobile phones at a local market. 

Lindsay married a woman from Kinnitty, County Offaly, Ireland, in a traditional Islamic religious ceremony, which had no legal recognition in the UK. He divorced her eight days later to marry Samantha Lewthwaite. Lewthwaite, a native of County Down, Northern Ireland, had converted to Islam at the age of 17 after moving to Aylesbury. Lewthwaite lived with him and gave birth to their second child two months after his death.

Abdullah el-Faisal, a controversial imam convicted of attempting to incite sectarian murders in 2003, later claimed to have been close to Lindsay.

Wife

Lindsay's wife, Samantha Lewthwaite, denied his involvement until authorities produced forensic evidence to confirm his identity. She later said she abhorred the attacks and that her husband's mind had been poisoned by "radicals".

By 2015, she had been accused of causing the deaths of more than 400 people. Now dubbed the 'White Widow', Lewthwaite is an alleged member of the Somalia-based radical Islamic militant group Al-Shabaab.

Involvement in London bombings

Lindsay detonated his bomb, killing 26 people, on a train travelling between King's Cross St Pancras and Russell Square stations.

House arson
On 22 July 2005, police and fire services were called to Lindsay's home in Aylesbury after neighbours reported a strong smell of petrol coming from it.  It was suspected to be a retaliatory arson attack on the empty property. Later it was revealed in the local press that Lindsay's wife and son were living under 
"police protection" and would not be returning home.  In December 2005, two 17-year-olds were convicted at Aylesbury Crown Court of arson in circumstances where they were reckless as to whether the life of another person would be endangered and each sentenced to 18 months youth detention with a training order.

See also
List of notable converts to Islam

References

External links
"Blue Watch relive the bomb hell inside carriage 346A" by Mark Townsend, The Observer, 9 October 2005
Profile of Germaine Lindsay
Profile of Radical Jamaican-born Cleric Sheikh Abdullah al-Faisal al-Jamaikee published by the Jamestown Foundation in Washington, DC
" Fourth bomber's name disclosed" (Accessed 15 July 2005) BBC News
"Market town may hold clues to fourth suspect" (Accessed 15 July 2005) Financial Times
Russell Square explosion

1985 births
2005 deaths
2005 suicides
English people of Jamaican descent
Converts to Sunni Islam
Islam in the United Kingdom
Islamic terrorism in England
Jamaican emigrants to the United Kingdom
Jamaican Islamists
British Islamists
People from Aylesbury
People from Huddersfield
Perpetrators of the July 2005 London bombings
Jamaican murderers
21st-century Jamaican criminals
Suicide bombers
Suicides in Bloomsbury